Karima Francis (born Karima Antoinette Francis Cunliffe, 28 April 1987 in Blackpool, England) is an English singer-songwriter.

Karima was named by The Observer the number one act to watch in 2009. After performing at In The City in Manchester and SXSW in Austin she was signed by the independent record label Kitchenware Records/Columbia Records. She signed with Vertigo Records, a division of Mercury Music Group, in 2011.

She released her first album, The Author, on 23 March 2009, 
The record was produced by Kevin Bacon and Jonathan Quarmby. The Author was mixed by Micheal Brauer and mastered by Bob Ludwig.

Notable performances include appearing on Later With Jools Holland, supporting Paul Simon on the main stage at Hard Rock Calling, shows with Amy Winehouse, Patti Smith and Stereophonics, as well as playing The Royal Albert Hall in support of Teenage Cancer Trust.

Her second album, The Remedy, was released in August 2012. Produced by Flood (U2, PJ Harvey, Smashing Pumpkins, Foals, Warpaint, St Vincent )

She recorded her third studio album Black (2016), which was produced by Dan Austin.

Discography
Studio albums
 The Author (2009)
 The Remedy (2012)
 Black (2016)

References

1987 births
Living people
English women singer-songwriters
People from Blackpool
Musicians from Lancashire
21st-century English women singers
21st-century English singers